is the stage makeup worn by kabuki actors, mostly when performing kabuki plays in the  style. The term also applies to a painting method in which two brushes are used simultaneously, one for the color and the other used to create shading or other details.

 makeup generally consists of brightly coloured stripes or patterns over a white foundation, the colours and patterns symbolising aspects of the character. Though  was originated and developed extensively by members of the  family of actors, some conventions are creations of the  line.

Colours 

Only a few colours are used in  makeup; red, blue, brown and black. Whilst black is simply used to exaggerate features, such as eyebrows and the line of the mouth, the other colours are used to tell the audience about the character's nature.

Red  indicates a powerful hero role, often a character with virtue and courage.

Blue makeup is used to represent a villain, human or not, and represents negative emotions such as fear and jealousy.

Patterns 

Some patterns are used for a number of roles, as they have come to represent a specific type of character over time, regardless of the play being performed:

  - this style of  features two red lines leading up into the hairline, one leading off the eyebrows and one leading off the eyeline. This pattern is used to express quiet strength in heroes.
Its dramatic red lines represent the power and righteous anger of the character.
  - a stylish form of red  used for young, handsome and virtuous heroes.
Some forms of  make the character look like a monkey, or a crab.
  - a dramatic form of blue  used to indicate a villainous imperial court aristocrat looking to overthrow those in power.

References

Kabuki
Costume design
Makeup
Cultural history of Japan
Japanese fashion